JS Towada (AOE-422) is the lead ship of the s of the Japanese Maritime Self-Defense Force. She was commissioned on 24 March 1987.

Construction and career
She is laid down on 17 April 1985 and launched on 25 March 1986. Commissioned on 24 March 1987 with the hull number AOE-422.

Gallery

References

External links

Auxiliary ships of the Japan Maritime Self-Defense Force
Ships built by Hitachi Zosen Corporation
1986 ships
Towada-class replenishment ships